Gabriele Sella (15 April 1963 – 2 June 2010) was an Italian cyclist. He competed in the sprint event at the 1984 Summer Olympics.

References

External links
 

1963 births
2010 deaths
Italian male cyclists
Olympic cyclists of Italy
Cyclists at the 1984 Summer Olympics
Cyclists from the Metropolitan City of Venice